Bishop DuBourg High School is a private, Roman Catholic high school in St. Louis, Missouri.  It is located in the Roman Catholic Archdiocese of Saint Louis.

Notable alumni
 Norbert Leo Butz (1985), Tony Award winning American stage, musical theatre, television and film actor
 Jack Dorsey (1995), Co-founder of Twitter, Co-founder of Square, Inc.
 Rory Ellinger, (1959), civil rights activist and accomplished Legislator in the Missouri House of Representatives from 2010-2014.
 Steve Frank (1959), Noted attorney, and former professional and national team soccer player.
 Larry Hausmann (1959), Professional and national team soccer player.
 Jeannie Leavitt (1985), First female fighter pilot in the US Air Force
 Rich Niemann (1964), NBA player
 Ken Page (1974), American actor/singer
 Rex Sinquefield (1962), co-founder of Dimensional Fund Advisors, founder and president of the Show-Me Institute, a public policy research organization based in St. Louis.
 Steve Stenger (1990), American attorney, former Democratic politician, and former chief executive of Saint Louis County, sentenced to 46 months in prison for bribery and corruption

Notes and references

Roman Catholic Archdiocese of St. Louis
Roman Catholic secondary schools in St. Louis
Educational institutions established in 1950
1950 establishments in Missouri